Belel Forest Park is a forest park in the Gambia. Established on January 1, 1954, it covers 449.2 hectares.

The average altitude of the terrain above sea level is 28 meters.

References
  

Protected areas established in 1954
Forest parks of the Gambia